The Sapo language, also known as Sarpo or Southern Krahn, is a Kru language of the Niger–Congo language family. It is spoken in eastern Liberia, primarily in Grand Gedeh County and Sinoe County, by the Sapo people. Its dialects include: Juarzon, Kabade (Karbardae), Nomopo (Nimpo), Putu, Sinkon (Senkon), and Waya (Wedjah).

See also 
 Languages of Africa
 Krahn people

References 

 
Languages of Liberia
Wee languages